Three ships of the Royal New Zealand Navy have been named HMNZS Taupo:
, was a frigate, 1948–1962
, was a  patrol vessel, 1975–1991, pennant number P3570
, is a  inshore patrol boat, launched in 2008, pennant number P3570

Royal New Zealand Navy ship names